is a Japanese actress. She played the lead  actress role in 1-Ichi, a prequel to Ichi the Killer. In 2004, she played a supporting role in Izo. With Azuma Mami she is part of a CM duo called G☆cups, a reference to their large busts (Chisato's, at 86 cm, is large for a Japanese woman).

Filmography
 1-Ichi (1 イチ, 2003)
 雀鬼くずれ (2003)
 実録・九州やくざ列伝　兇犬とよばれた男 (2003)
 実録・事件　青梅「姉妹」バラバラ殺人 (2004)
 北九州ヤクザ戦争　侠嵐　完結編 (2004)
 すくらんぶるハーツ　恋のソナタ (Sukuramburu hatsu koi no sonata, lit. "Scramble Hearts - Sonata of Love", 2004)
 Izo (2004)

External links
 Amate Chisato Official Site
 
 Amate Chisato's JMDb profile

1980 births
Japanese actresses
Living people
Actors from Fukuoka Prefecture